Interstate 240 (I-240) is a  auxiliary Interstate Highway in the US state of Tennessee that forms a bypass around the southern and eastern neighborhoods of Memphis. Combined, I-240 and its parent, I-40, form a contiguous beltway around most of Memphis. I-240 runs from I-40 in Midtown Memphis to I-40 and Sam Cooper Boulevard in East Memphis. Throughout its length, it provides access to I-55, multiple U.S. and state routes, and the Memphis International Airport. The segment between the western terminus and I-55 is a north–south route, and the segment between I-55 and the eastern terminus runs east to west. Throughout its length, I-240 is designated as the Dr. Martin Luther King Jr. Expressway, the W.B. Fowler Sr. Expressway, and the Avron B. Fogelman Expressway.

The first sections of I-240 were opened in 1962, and the present-day route was completed in 1971. I-240 was first envisioned in the 1950s as a complete circular beltway around Memphis. The western segment between I-40 and I-55 was designated as I-255 until 1973, however. Citizen opposition to the routing of I-40 through Overton Park in the central part of Memphis resulted in I-40 being rerouted onto what was originally the northern loop of I-240 in 1981. As a result of this change, I-240's exits are still numbered according to their original mileage, which today is inconsistent with its length.

Route description
I-240 begins as a north–south route in Midtown Memphis east of downtown at a directional T interchange with I-40, which shifts from an east–west to a temporary north–south alignment here. I-240 runs almost directly south here, carrying six throughlanes, and reaches interchanges with Madison Avenue, Union Avenue, and E. H. Crump Boulevard/Lamar Avenue (unsigned U.S. Route 78 (US 78)) a short distance beyond this point. Access between these interchanges is provided via a complex network of collector–distributor lanes, and direct access to and from I-40 is also provided for Madison Avenue. Shifting slightly to the west, I-240 continues southward, crossing a railyard and passing next to Elmwood Cemetery before reaching a cloverleaf interchange with South Parkway about  later. The freeway the continues south, shifting slightly eastward, and reaches a combination interchange with I-55 in South Memphis about  later. Here, a series of two-lane ramps carry I-240 traffic from a north–south to an east–west alignment. 

I-240 continues east-northeast once again as a six-lane freeway and immediately crosses US 51 (Elvis Presley Boulevard) without an interchange. It then passes through the southern neighborhoods of Memphis for the next  before intersecting with a connector road to the Memphis International Airport to the south. This interchange is almost a complete cloverleaf, with three loop ramps and one underpass ramp. A few miles later, the highway reaches US 78 (Lamar Avenue) in an interchange that is also nearly a complete cloverleaf, with three loop ramps and one flyover ramp. Here, the Interstate expands to eight lanes and shifts slightly east-southeast. A short distance later, I-240 has a partial cloverleaf interchange (parclo) with the northern terminus of SR 176 (Getwell Road). Over the next , I-240 runs along the northern bank of Nonconnah Creek, shifting east-northeast before reaching an interchange with the western terminus of SR 385 (Bill Morris Parkway), a controlled-access spur that serves the southeastern suburbs of Memphis, where it briefly reduces to six lanes. The highway then turns and proceeds north, expanding back to eight lanes, and reaches an unusually configured interchange with US 72 (Poplar Avenue) a short distance later. Continuing almost directly north, the freeway reaches a parclo interchange with Walnut Grove Road (the unsigned western terminus of SR 23) almost  beyond this point. I-240 then gradually shifts northwest and reaches its northern terminus almost  later at a four-level stack interchange with I-40, Sam Cooper Boulevard, and US 64/US 70/US 79 (Summer Avenue) in East Memphis.

History

Planning and construction controversies

I-240 was first planned in 1955 as a  beltway that would completely encircle midtown Memphis, with the exception of the segment between I-40 and I-55, which was initially designated as I-255. In 1973, that number was decommissioned in favor of I-240 running in a full loop. I-40 was planned to run directly east to west between the western terminus of I-240 in downtown, commonly known as the Midtown Interchange, to what is now the eastern terminus of I-240 in eastern Memphis. However, in 1957, citizens collected 10,000 signatures protesting the route of I-40, which was to cut through Overton Park, a  public park in Midtown that contained a wooded refuge, the Memphis Zoo, the Memphis Brooks Museum of Art, the Memphis College of Art, a 9-hole golf course, an amphitheater that was the site of Elvis Presley's first paid concert in 1954, and other features. They also founded an activist group called Citizens to Preserve Overton Park, and waged a multiyear legal battle, which culminated in  the US Supreme Court ruling in their favor in 1971.

The Supreme Court remanded the case to the District Court for further review, and it ruled that the highway commission had not adequately explored alternative routes. The Tennessee Department of Transportation (TDOT), however, continued to explore alternative options to construct the route through Overton Park, including tunneling under the park or constructing the highway below grade, but ultimately concluded that these alternatives were too expensive. On January 9, 1981, then-Governor Lamar Alexander submitted a request to the then-Secretary of Transportation Neil Goldschmidt to cancel the route through Overton Park, which was approved seven days later. I-40 was then rerouted onto a concurrency with the northern loop of I-240, and I-240 was removed from this section the following year. This turned I-240 into a semi-beltway around the southern part of the city, and exits were not renumbered. Part of the proposed I-40 route was constructed from North Highland Street east to the eastern I-40/I-240 junction. The road is now called Sam Cooper Boulevard and is owned by the city. In addition, right-of-way was acquired west of the park and many structures demolished to make way for the Interstate. Most of these empty lots have since been built over.

Construction
The first segment of I-240, located between US 51 and US 78 (Lamar Avenue), opened on December 15, 1962. The section between US 78 and Walnut Grove Road opened on December 31, 1962. The section between Walnut Grove Road and the interchange with I-40 and Sam Cooper Boulevard, along with the short segment of I-40 north to US 64/US 70/US 79 (Summer Avenue), which was then part of I-240, was dedicated on October 9, 1963, and opened 14 days later. On July 23, 1965, the segment between I-55 and South Parkway opened. The segment between South Parkway and US 78 (Lamar Avenue, E. H. Crump Boulevard) opened on October 20, 1966. The section between US 78 and Union Avenue opened on May 27, 1971. The final section of the present-day alignment of I-240, located between Union Avenue and the Midtown interchange with I-40, opened on July 14, 1971. The connecting segments of I-40 between the Midtown interchange and Chelsea Avenue, which was then signed as part of I-240, and between US 51 and the Midtown interchange, were also opened at the same time. The last section of what was originally part of I-240 to be completed was the section between Chelsea Avenue and US 64/US 70/US 79, which is now part of I-40. Construction on this segment began in April 1974, and the section was opened to traffic on March 28, 1980, after years of delays.

I-40/I-240 interchange reconstructions

The cancelation of the section of I-40 through Overton Park rendered both interchanges with I-240 inadequate to handle the unplanned traffic patterns, thus necessitating their reconstruction. In addition, both interchanges contained ramps with hazardous sharp curves with some of the highest crash rates in the state. On the eastern interchange, reconstruction was accomplished in two separate projects. The first project, which began in January 2001 and was completed in June 2003, constructed a new two-lane flyover ramp from I-40 westbound to I-240 westbound, replacing a single-lane loop ramp, and widened I-240 south of the interchange. Also in this project, I-40 directly north of the interchange was reconstructed in preparation for the second project and the interchanges with US 64/US 70/US 79 (Summer Avenue) and White Station Road were modified. 

The second project was initially slated to begin in January 2004 but was delayed until October 2013 due to funding and redesign complications. A two-lane flyover was constructed to carry I-40 eastbound traffic through the interchange, replacing a one-lane ramp with a slow design speed. The single-lane ramp carrying I-40 westbound traffic through the interchange was rerouted to become the exit ramp for Summer Avenue and replaced with a two-lane flyover that connects to the flyover constructed in the first project. Additional aspects of this project widened the ramp between I-240 eastbound and I-40 eastbound to three lanes, widened both approaches to the interchange on I-40, which required a new 14-lane bridge over the Wolf River, widened the approach on I-240 south of the interchange, added throughlanes to Sam Cooper Boulevard, and reconfigured the SR 204 (Covington Pike) interchange. The project costed $109.3 million (equivalent to $ in ), which was, at the time, the highest-bid contract in state history and was completed on December 15, 2016.

The interchange with the western terminus of I-240 near Midtown Memphis was reconstructed between June 2003 and December 2006. This project consisted of converting the interchange into a directional T-interchange and the demolition of several unused ramps and bridges that had been constructed with the intent of I-40 continuing directly east of this interchange prior to the Overton Park controversy. The nearby cloverleaf interchange with SR 14 (Jackson Avenue) was also converted into a parclo interchange, and several additional auxiliary lanes and slip ramps were constructed. The northern merge with I-40 and I-240 was moved north of the SR 14 interchange.

Other projects
I-240 has seen significant reconstruction over its history as usage has exceeded design capacity. The portion between US 78 (Lamar Avenue) and Mount Moriah Road was widened to eight throughlanes in the early 2000s.

On January 18, 2008, the Federal Highway Administration (FHWA) authorized the states of Mississippi and Tennessee to extend I-69 from the I-40/SR 300 interchange in north Memphis to an  interchange on I-55 in Hernando, including the north–south portion of I-240. Tennessee has not signed the extension of the route, although Mississippi has already done so.

A widening project began on the stretch of I-240 from north of SR 385 to north of Walnut Grove Road in April 2011. This included adding one throughlane in each direction and a redesigning of the US 72 (Poplar Avenue) interchange, as well as new retaining walls and noise barriers. The project was completed in late 2014, more than one year later than initially expected.

Major incidents

On December 23, 1988, a tanker truck hauling liquefied propane crashed at the interchange between I-40 and the western terminus of I-240 and exploded, producing a massive fireball that enveloped the Interstate and started multiple structural fires. The tank was then propelled from the highway by the force of the combusting gas within the tank and crashed into a nearby duplex, starting additional fires. The incident resulted in the deaths of six motorists and three occupants of nearby buildings and injured 10 people.

On March 24, 2010, a sinkhole formed in the two leftmost northbound lanes north of the Walnut Grove interchange. It was initially thought to have been a smaller pothole and had been paved over the day before. It formed around 3:00 pm and damaged several cars, although no injuries were reported. These two lanes were shut down until March 28 while the sinkhole was filled.

Exit list
The exits on I-240 run clockwise, reflecting their initial numbering as part of a circumferential beltway. Because of the rerouting of I-40, I-40 retains I-240's historic exit numbers 1 through 12A–C.

See also
 
 
 Transportation in Memphis, Tennessee

References

External links

 

40-2 Tennessee
40-2
2 (Tennessee)
Transportation in Shelby County, Tennessee
Transportation in Memphis, Tennessee
240